Tarita may refer to the following notable people:
Given name
Tarita Botsman, Australian operatic soprano, actor, writer and director
Tarita Teriipaia (born 1941), French Polynesian actress, wife of Marlon Brando
Tarita Virtue (born 1970), Trinidadian-American private investigator and model

Surname
Elena Tărîță (born 1954), Romanian sprinter